"Sacrilege" is the first single from the Yeah Yeah Yeahs' fourth album Mosquito released on February 25, 2013 as a digital download. It was recorded at Sonic Ranch Studios in Tornillo, Texas and produced by TV on the Radio's David Andrew Sitek and English record producer Nick Launay.

Performances
The band appeared on Late Show with David Letterman on April 5, 2013 to perform "Sacrilege" accompanied by the gospel choir Broadway Inspirational Voices.

Reception
"Sacrilege" was named "Best New Track" by Pitchfork Media February 26, 2013. Dan Martinson stated in his positive review, "Karen O falls for an angel who falls from the sky, the constant clank of Brian Chase's cymbals and Nick Zinner's guitar curlicues evoke "Gimme Shelter" with an exaggerated gospel swing."

Music video
The music video was directed by French collective Megaforce and premiered on March 26, 2013. The video stars English model and actress Lily Cole. The video consists of a chronologically reversed sequence of events outlining the rationale and events leading to a group of people in a small town shooting a man and burning a promiscuous woman (Cole) alive. The band does not appear in the video.

In popular culture
"Sacrilege" was featured in one episode of The Originals.

"Sacrilege" was also featured in one episode of Suits (third season, first episode).

Track listing

Charts

References

External links
 
 
 Usage in film and television: see "Yeah Yeah Yeahs - Soundtrack. 'Sacrilege'" at IMDb

2013 singles
Yeah Yeah Yeahs songs
Song recordings produced by Nick Launay
Songs written by Karen O
Songs written by Brian Chase
2013 songs
Interscope Records singles
Songs written by Nick Zinner